Mopanveldophis is a genus of snake in the family Colubridae  that contains the sole species Mopanveldophis zebrinus. It is found in northern Namibia.

References 

Colubrids
Monotypic snake genera
Reptiles described in 2000
Snakes of Africa
Reptiles of Namibia
Endemic fauna of Namibia